Lezate Football is an Iranian live television program that broadcasts, analyzes and reviews European football on IRIB Varzesh. Lezate Football program, performed by Mehdi Tutunchi and Rasoul Majidi and produced by Arash Mousaei, aims to improve the football information of its audience and also to create entertainment, in addition to live broadcast of football matches, broadcast news, sidelines and press conferences of these matches. The first episode of this program went on the air on 22 December 2018.

Reviewing world sports newspapers, broadcasting press conferences of coaches and players, communicating with the fan clubs of European clubs operating in the country, communicating with foreign experts and players, conveys a familiar name, extraordinary feeling and mood to the viewers of Lezate Football program. In a poll conducted by IRIB in August 2019, Lezate Football became the second most watched program on IRIB Varzesh with 12.5% of viewers. Considering that the sample population of this poll is large and it has been held in 33 cities, it can be said that out of the 80 million population of Iran, 10 million people watched Lezate Football. The second season of this program went on the air on 2 November 2019.

Background 
Lezate Football program went on the air on 22 December 2018 and has been broadcast in 4 seasons so far.

Attributes

Broadcast 
Lezate Football broadcast on IRIB Varzesh every day, 1 hour to 30 minutes before the start of football matches until late at night.

Performance 
This program is performed by Mehdi Tutunchi and Rasoul Majidi.

Theme

Program process 
In addition to live broadcast of European football with the performance of Mehdi Tutunchi and Rasoul Majidi, Lezate Football program analyzes and examines these competitions with the presence of the best experts.

Program sections 
 Review of world sports newspapers:
In this section, the headlines and news of world sports newspapers are examined.
 Broadcasting news conferences of coaches and players:
In each episode, news conferences of the matches that are to be aired on Lezate Football antenna are broadcast with subtitles.
 Communicating with the support clubs of European clubs active in the country:
Usually for special matches, the fan club of the two competing teams is contacted.
 Communication with foreign experts and players:
In some episodes, Lezate Football communicates with famous foreign experts and players.
 Guest:
In each episode of the program, experts, commentators, coaches and players are invited to the program and talk about the match with the presenters.
 Items:
In this section, items from teams, players and coaches of European leagues are broadcast.
 Pre-match:
In this section, a review of the conditions of the teams organizing the match in the previous weeks, a statistical review with a historical perspective is done.

Season information

See also 
 IRIB Varzesh
 Gozareshe Varzeshi
 Football 120

References

External links 
 
 
 Program page on IRIB Varzesh site

Association football on television
Football in Iran
2010s Iranian television series
Association football television series